Hynek is both a Czech masculine given name and a surname. It is a pet form of the name Henry.

Notable people with the name include:

Surname
 J. Allen Hynek (1910–1986), American astronomer, professor, and ufologist
 Joel Hynek, visual effects artist who has worked on over 30 films since 1980

Given name
 Hynek Berka z Dubé, Bohemian knight and founder of the Berka z Dubé aristocracy line
 Hynek Bílek (born 1981), Czech ice dancer
 Hynek Čermák (born 1973), Czech actor
 Hynek Fajmon (born 1968), Czech politician and Member of the European Parliament
 Hynek Hromada (1935–2012), Czech sports shooter
 Hynek Kmoníček (born 1962), Czech diplomat and politician
 Hynek Krušina of Lichtenburg (1392–1454) Hussite commander and governor
 Hynek Zohorna (born 1990), Czech ice hockey player

See also
 1842 Hynek, asteroid

Czech masculine given names